Mark Warriedar Nevill (born 1 July 1947) is a former Australian politician.

He was born in North Fremantle and was a geologist before entering politics. In 1983 he was elected to the Western Australian Legislative Council as a Labor member for South-East Province, moving to Mining and Pastoral in 1989. He was a parliamentary secretary from 1990 to 1993, when he became Deputy Leader of the Opposition in the Council, holding a variety of shadow portfolios until he lost the position in 1997. On 23 August 1999 he resigned from the Labor Party to sit as an independent. He lost his seat in 2001.

References

1947 births
Living people
Independent members of the Parliament of Western Australia
Members of the Western Australian Legislative Council
Australian Labor Party members of the Parliament of Western Australia
21st-century Australian politicians